Coed or mixed-gender education is the integrated education of male and female students in the same environment.

Coed may also refer to:
 COED (website) - an online entertainment magazine that focuses on college lifestyle 
 The COED Project, software project created by the US Department of Commerce in the 1970s
 Coed Records, an American record label
 Coed School, a South Korean dance/pop group 
 Betws-y-Coed, a village in Conwy County Borough, Wales
 Llwyd ap Cil Coed, a character in Welsh mythology, whose surname means "trees"
 Concise Oxford English Dictionary, a popular dictionary

See also 
 Betty Co-ed (disambiguation)